"Wrong Ideas" is a song written by Shel Silverstein and performed by Brenda Lee.  The song reached #6 on the U.S. country chart and #5 on the Canadian country chart in 1974.  It was featured on her 1972 album, New Sunrise.

References

1972 songs
1973 singles
Songs written by Shel Silverstein
Brenda Lee songs
MCA Records singles